The term Pax Austriaca, sometimes Pax Habsburgica, has been used by scholars to describe the imperial ideology of the House of Habsburg, also known as House of Austria. The Archduke Frederick III is credited as the initiator of the ideology as he was the first Habsburg to be elected Holy Roman Emperor, and coined the motto A.E.I.O.U. (All the world is subject to Austria). His successor Emperor Maximilian I expanded Habsburg territories and did so with marriages rather than war, thus establishing the motto "Bella gerunt alii, tu felix Austria nube" ("let others wage war; you, happy Austria, marry"). Charles V notably attempted to actually enforce the hegemonical peace in Europe. Further attempts to establish a Pax Habsburgica in Europe continued until the 30 years war. The Peace of Westphalia ended the universal aspirations of the Habsburg monarchy and put an end to the possibility of a Pax Austriaca, although the term has also been used to describe later policies of the Austrian Empire and Austria-Hungary.

References

External links
The Middle Ages in the Austrian tradition in Images and Ideas of the Middle Ages
The grand strategy of the Habsbsburg Empire
Pax Austriaca: Sinn und Geschichte des österreichischen Staatsgedankens
The Practice of Strategy: From Alexander the Great to the Present
Gasparo Contarini, Venice, Rome, and Reform
Le prime strette dell'Austria in Italia
Die Allegorie der Austria: die Entstehung des Gesamtstaatsgedankens in der österreichisch-ungarischen Monarchie und die bildende Kunst

House of Habsburg
Austriaca